Sepia papillata is a species of cuttlefish native to the southeastern Atlantic Ocean and southwestern Indian Ocean. Its natural range stretches from Lüderitz Bay, South Africa, to the coast of KwaZulu-Natal off the Tugela and Umvoti Rivers. It is also present in Mascarene Ridge. It lives at depths of between 26 and 210 m.

Sepia papillata grows to a mantle length of 140 mm.

The type specimen was collected near the Cape of Good Hope, South Africa. It is deposited at the Muséum National d'Histoire Naturelle in Paris.

References

External links

Cuttlefish
Cephalopods described in 1832